Uma no Naishi (馬内侍, 949 - 1011) was a Japanese Waka poet and noble from the middle Heian period. She is enumerated as one of the Thirty-Six Female Immortals of Poetry alongside famous authors, poets, and contemporaries Sei Shōnagon and Murasaki Shikibu.

Naishi, as a contemporary and follower of Shōnagon, was a lady of the same court in Heian period Japan, and bettered her knowledge of Waka poetry through her connection to Shōnagon, who was famously known for her Waka poetry as well as her novel of courtly observations, The Pillow Book (枕草子makura no sōshi). Shōnagon was a notorious rival of fellow Immortal of Poetry, Murasaki Shikibu, author of The Tale of Genji.

Her poems are included in the Japanese imperial poetry anthology Shūi Wakashū. She also has a personal collection entitled Uma no Naishi-shū (馬内侍集).

At some point in her life, she had a love affair with Major Captain of the Left Asamitsu, writing a poem for him. Of the Waka poems she wrote, only three have survived into modernity. Near the end of her life, Naishi took Buddhist vows and withdrew to a temple to serve as a monk.

Writing 

This poem was written in response to a confession of love by Asamitsu, Major Captain of the Left.

References

External links
 Uma no Naishi's poetry online in Japanese
Portrait
Smithsonian-held Portrait

Japanese poets
10th-century Japanese women writers
10th-century writers
949 births
1011 deaths
Japanese women poets